Culinary tourism or food tourism or gastronomy tourism is the exploration of food as the purpose of tourism. It is considered a vital component of the tourism experience.  Dining out is common among tourists and "food is believed to rank alongside climate, accommodation, and scenery" in importance to tourists.

Culinary tourism became prominent in 2001 after Erik Wolf, president of the World Food Travel Association, wrote a white paper on the subject.

Overview

Culinary or food tourism is the pursuit of unique and memorable eating and drinking experiences, both near and far. Culinary tourism differs from agritourism in that culinary tourism is considered a subset of cultural tourism (cuisine is a manifestation of culture) whereas agritourism is considered a subset of rural tourism, but culinary tourism and agritourism are inextricably linked, as the seeds of cuisine can be found in agriculture. Culinary/food tourism is not limited to gourmet food.  Food tourism can be considered a subcategory of experiential travel.

While many cities, regions, or countries are known for their food, culinary tourism is not limited by food culture. Every tourist eats about three times a day, making food one of the fundamental economic drivers of tourism. Countries like Ireland, Peru, and Canada are making a significant investment in culinary tourism development and are seeing results with visitor spending and overnight stays rising as a result of food tourism promotion and product development.

Food tourism includes activities such as taking cooking classes; going on food or drink tours; attending food and beverage festivals; participating in specialty dining experiences; shopping at specialty retail spaces; and visiting farms, markets, and producers.

Economic impact 
The World Food Travel Association estimates that food and beverage expenses account for 15% to 35% of all tourism spending, depending on the affordability of the destination. The WFTA lists possible food tourism benefits as including more visitors, more sales, more media attention, increased tax revenue, and greater community pride.

Cooking classes 
A growing area of culinary tourism is cooking classes. The formats vary from a short lesson lasting a few hours to full-day and multi-day courses. The focus for foreign tourists will usually be on the cuisine of the country they are visiting, whereas local tourists may be keen to experience cuisines new to them. Many cooking classes also include market tours to enhance the cultural experience. Some cooking classes are held in local people's homes, allowing foreign tourists to catch a glimpse of what daily life and cuisine look like for those in the country they're visiting. Both the local hosts and foreign guests benefit from the cross-cultural experience.

Food tours

Food tours vary by locale and by operator. They are common in major cities such as London, Paris, Rome, Florence, Toronto, Kuala Lumpur, and Barcelona.  

June 10, 2017, was the first annual National Food Tour Day, celebrating food tourism around the world. The World Food Travel Association introduced World Food Travel Day on April 18, 2018, as a way to put the spotlight on how and why we travel to experience the world's culinary cultures. It is designed to bring awareness to both consumers and trade, and support the Association's mission – to preserve and promote culinary cultures through hospitality and tourism. The day is celebrated all around the world every year on April 18.

Benefits of Culinary or food tourism
Food tourism offers a multitude of benefits for travelers, including:
Opportunities to try unique and authentic dishes
Immersion into local or street food culture 
History and Traditions Behind the Food We Eat
Supporting local economies by patronizing small businesses and food markets

See also 
 Cooking school
 Foodie
 Gourmet
 Gastronomy

References

External links
 World Food Travel Association
 World Food Travel Market

 Food and drink appreciation
 Types of tourism